Wael Koubrousli / Kobrosly is a Lebanese/French swimmer who has competed at the 2008 Olympic Games, and the 2012 Olympic Games. Wael represented Lebanon in 7 World Championships from 2006 to 2013, at Shanghai, Melbourne, Manchester, Rome, UAE, Shanghai and Barcelona.  He recorded more than 20 local swimming records, including in the 100-meter and 200-meter breaststroke.  At the 2007 Arab Games, he won the silver medal in the 100m breaststroke.

After his participation in the Beijing Olympics, Kobrosly earned a scholarship from Club Nautique Havrais, in Le Havre, France, to study for a master's degree of International Marketing from the "Universite Du Havre" in Le Havre city, where he trained under head coach Christos Paparrodopoulos, and swam alongside Olympic triple medalist, Hugues Duboscq.

Participations
Olympic Games
 2012 Summer Olympics (London)
 2008 Summer Olympics (Beijing)
World Championships
 World LC Championship 2013 - Barcelona, Spain. 
 World LC Championship 2011 - Shanghai, China.
 World SC Championship 2010 - Dubai, UAE.
 World LC Championship 2009 - Rome, Italy.
 World SC Championship 2008 - Manchester, England.
 World LC Championship 2007 - Melbourne, Australia.
 World SC Championship 2006 - Shanghai, China.
International Championships
 Spanish LC Nationals ELITE 2012 - Malaga, Spain (Qualification for London 2012 OG).
 French LC Nationals ELITE 2012 - Dunkirk, France. (Qualification for London 2012 OG).
 French LC Nationals 2, 2012 - Bethune, France.
 French LC Nationals 2, 2011 - Chalons Sur Saon, France.
 French SC Nationals ELITE 2010 - Chartres, France.
 Universiade Games 2009 - Belgrade, Serbia.
 Jazira-Othodoxy Swim Meet 2008 - Amman, Jordan.
 Universiade 2007 - Bangkok, Thailand.
 International Uni. Champs 2007 - Istanbul, Turkey.
 Asian Games 2006 - Doha - Qatar.
Arab competitions	
 Arab Games 2011 - Doha, Qatar.
 Arab Games 2007 - Cairo, Egypt.
 Arab Clubs Champs 2006 - Irbid, Jordan.
 Islamic Solidarity Games 2005 - Jeddah, KSA.
 Arab School Championship 2004 - Jeddah, KSA.
 Jable-Lathkiyye 30 km sea race - Jable, Syria.
 West Asian Games 2005 - Doha, Qatar.
 International Friendship Champs 2004 - Kuwait.
 West Asian Games 2003 - Damascus, Syria.

References

1988 births
Living people
Lebanese male swimmers
Olympic swimmers of Lebanon
Swimmers at the 2012 Summer Olympics
Swimmers at the 2008 Summer Olympics
Sportspeople from Beirut
Sportspeople from Le Havre
Swimmers at the 2006 Asian Games
Asian Games competitors for Lebanon